Sir Thomas Meredyth (died 1677) was an Irish politician. 

Meredyth was the son of Richard Meredith and Sarah Bathow. He was admitted to Trinity College Dublin in 1609 and to Lincoln's Inn in 1628. On 15 July 1630 he was knighted by his step-father, Adam Loftus, 1st Viscount Loftus. Meredyth represented Old Leighlin in the Irish House of Commons from 1634 to 1635.

He married Letitia Fortescue and they had two sons, Charles and Arthur, and two daughters.

References

Year of birth uncertain
1677 deaths
17th-century Anglo-Irish people
Alumni of Trinity College Dublin
Irish MPs 1634–1635
Knights Bachelor
Members of Lincoln's Inn
Members of the Parliament of Ireland (pre-1801) for County Carlow constituencies
Thomas